Sonata for Piano and Violin No. 21 in E minor (K. 304/300c) is a work by Wolfgang Amadeus Mozart. It was composed in 1778 while Mozart was in Paris. The piece was composed during the same period that Mozart's mother, Anna Maria Mozart, died, and the sonata's mood reflects this. It is the only instrumental work by Mozart whose home key is E minor.

References

External links

Full recording by Corey Cerovsek (violin) and Jeremy Denk (piano) from the Isabella Stewart Gardner Museum in MP3 format
Violin Sonata in E Minor Full Score, Parts and Recordings on the Pertucci Music Library.

304
1778 compositions
Compositions in E minor